Tim Trench is a character in the DC Comics universe, who first appeared in Wonder Woman v1 #179 (November–December 1968). He was later killed in 52 Week 18 (September 2006).

Fictional character biography
Introduced as an ally of the pre-Crisis Wonder Woman, Timothy Trench's first appearance (seen as a shadowy figure on page 23) was in Wonder Woman vol. 1 #179 (November–December 1968) and his first formal appearance was the next issue. A middle-aged tough guy and private eye, Trench carried a single gun, which he lovingly referred to as "Lulu". He was intended as a knockoff of Sam Spade, from the Maltese Falcon, using the word "gunsel" as Spade did to refer to low-level hoodlums and mentioning his late partner Archie Miles (Spade's partner was Miles Archer). Tim aided Wonder Woman and I Ching in defeating the terrorist Doctor Cyber, but Wonder Woman's long-time boyfriend Steve Trevor was killed in the process. Trench exited with issue #182 (May–June 1969), taking with him a box of gems stolen from Doctor Cyber.

Trench was reintroduced in Detective Comics #460 (June 1976) with a two-part back-up feature in Detective Comics. Appearing considerably younger, the tough-talking gumshoe Trench was located in St. Louis with an office above a repertory theatre, overseen by Box-Office Sadie, that consistently screens Humphrey Bogart films. Trench had abandoned "Lulu" for twin .357 Magnums housed in shoulder holsters.

Twenty years later, Trench resurfaced having joined the superhero team Hero Hotline. Trench was costumed in brown hat and gloves, green jacket, domino mask and a shirt with a big red "T" on it. The only chronicled mission Trench underwent as a member of the team was witnessed in the Vertigo title Swamp Thing and Trench was absent from all the action, having been caught in traffic.

52
After his death in 52 Week 18, Trench was revealed to have been a member of the Croatoan Society. Its members included Ralph Dibny, Detective Chimp, Edogawa Sangaku, and Traci Thirteen. It was at a scheduled meeting of these detectives at the House of Mystery that his body was discovered, wearing Doctor Fate's helmet.

Investigation by Dibny, Detective Chimp and the Shadowpact revealed that Trench's death came as a result of his attempt to assume the mantle of Dr. Fate without paying due sacrifice first. Later, this was revealed to be a deception by Felix Faust, who intentionally killed Trench to lead Dibny on a quest.

References

External links
Thrilling Detective: Timothy Trench
DC Universe Guide: Tim Trench
Obscure Characters Index: Tim Trench

Trench, Tim
Trench, Tim
Comics characters introduced in 1968
Characters created by Dennis O'Neil